Hôpital Saint-Antoine is a university hospital of the Assistance Publique–Hôpitaux de Paris (AP-HP) located in the 12th arrondissement of Paris at 184, rue du Faubourg-Saint-Antoine. It is part of the AP-HP–Sorbonne University hospital-university group.

During the COVID-19 pandemic, the Saint-Antoine hospital participated in therapeutic research, in particular the Corimuno-plasm (plasma therapy) clinical trial, with Karine Lacombe's team.

References

External links

Hôpital Saint-Antoine

Hospitals in Paris
Buildings and structures completed in 1791
Hospital buildings completed in the 18th century
Teaching hospitals in France
Buildings and structures in the 12th arrondissement of Paris
Hospitals established in the 18th century
1791 establishments in France